Reinhart Probst (born 17 April 1957) is a former professional tennis player from Germany.

Biography
Probst was a right-handed player, born in Coburg. In 1977 he partnered Ulrich Marten in the men's doubles at the Wimbledon Championships and ended the year by winning a tour event in Zurich, with Nikola Pilić.

He featured in two Davis Cup ties for West Germany in 1978, the first an away fixture against Switzerland, in which he and Ulrich Pinner had the distinction of securing the tie by winning the doubles rubber. It was again Pinner that he partnered with when he played West Germany's doubles rubber in Budapest, a four set loss to Hungarian players Péter Szőke and Balázs Taróczy.

In 1979 he had the best singles performance of his career when he made the semi-finals in Bogota, with wins over Andrés Gómez, Iván Molina and Roger Guedes.

He returned to the West German Davis Cup team in 1980, for a Europe Zone semi-final against Sweden in Bastad. The Swedes had a 2–0 lead going into the doubles and Probst and his partner Rolf Gehring needed a win to keep the tie alive, which they did with a straight sets victory, over the Swedish pairing of Per Hjertquist and Stefan Simonsson, before Björn Borg ended West Germany's campaign in the reverse singles.

On the Grand Prix circuit in 1980 he was runner-up in the doubles at the German Open and had another win over Andrés Gómez, en route to the quarter-finals of the singles event at the 1980 Stuttgart Indoor.

Grand Prix career finals

Doubles: 1 (1–1)

See also
List of Germany Davis Cup team representatives

References

External links
 
 
 

1957 births
Living people
West German male tennis players
People from Coburg
Sportspeople from Upper Franconia
Tennis people from Bavaria